Court House station is an island platformed Washington Metro station in the Courthouse neighborhood of Arlington, Virginia, United States. The station was opened on December 1, 1979, and is operated by the Washington Metropolitan Area Transit Authority (WMATA). Weekday ridership is approximately 7,000 passengers per day. The station serves the Orange and Silver Lines.

Location 
As the name implies, the station is located near the Arlington County government and court complex, with its main entrance at the intersection of Wilson Boulevard and Uhle Street.

History
The station opened on December 1, 1979. Presently, there are long-range plans to create a new entrance for the station at its western end. These plans envision an elevator that would connect the western end of the platform to a location near the corner of Clarendon Boulevard and Barton Street.

Station layout 
This station is the third deepest station on the Orange and Silver Lines behind L'Enfant Plaza and Rosslyn. A long bank of escalators connects the upper mezzanine to the lower mezzanine. The platforms are located below the mezzanine.

Court House is one of the few Washington Metro stations outside the Red Line that contain deep-bored, elliptical escalator banks. Unlike most Metro stations, Court House station has four exits.

References

External links
 

 The Schumin Web Transit Center: Court House Station
 Uhle Street entrance from Google Maps Street View

Stations on the Orange Line (Washington Metro)
Stations on the Silver Line (Washington Metro)
Transportation in Arlington County, Virginia
Washington Metro stations in Virginia
Railway stations in the United States opened in 1979
1979 establishments in Virginia